Sebastian Hiram Shaw is a supervillain appearing in American comic books published by Marvel Comics. He has been frequently depicted as an adversary of the X-Men.

A mutant, Shaw possesses the ability to absorb energy and transform it into his own raw strength. He is the leader of the New York branch of the Hellfire Club, an exclusive secret society composed of mutants bent on world domination, although to the public, he is a legitimate businessman and ordinary human. He once funded the mutant-hunting Sentinel program to keep it under his thumb. In 2009, Shaw was ranked as IGN's 55th Greatest Comic Book Villain of All Time.

Kevin Bacon played the character in the 2011 film X-Men: First Class.

Publication history
Created by writer Chris Claremont and artist/co-writer John Byrne, Sebastian Shaw first appeared in The Uncanny X-Men #129 (Jan. 1980). John Byrne based the appearance of Sebastian Shaw on British actor Robert Shaw, who had died in 1978.

Fictional character biography
Sebastian Shaw was born in Pittsburgh, Pennsylvania. His power first manifested shortly after he was accepted to engineering school and his father Jacob Shaw died after he contracted an incurable disease. Sebastian Shaw devoted himself to his studies and created Shaw Industries, becoming a millionaire by age 30 and a billionaire by age 40.

Joining the Hellfire Club
Shaw became engaged to a woman named Lourdes Chantel, also a mutant, and was soon initiated into the Hellfire Club thanks to his vast fortune along with Warren Worthington, Jr. (father of Archangel), Howard Stark (father of Tony Stark) and Sir James Braddock (father of Brian and Betsy Braddock), having caught the attention of Ned Buckman, then White King of Hellfire Club's New York Branch. Shaw became part of the Council of the Chosen, earning the rank of Black Bishop. Lourdes did not trust Buckman, and feared that Shaw's ambition and the nature of the Hellfire Club would corrupt him.

Taking over
Lourdes is soon seemingly killed by Sentinels in a battle. Upon discovering that Ned Buckman, the White King of the Council, is supporting Steven Lang's Project: Armageddon and its Sentinels, he executes a coup, using Emma Frost's telepathy to make Buckman kill all the Council of the Chosen, including his own White Queen, Paris Seville, and then himself. Shaw proclaims himself Black King, remakes the Council of the Chosen into his Inner Circle and gathers Emma Frost, Harry Leland and the non-mutant cyborg Donald Pierce as the Lords Cardinal of Hellfire Club. At Shaw's side is Tessa, who, unbeknownst to him, is a spy working for Charles Xavier.

As the leader of the Inner Circle of the Hellfire Club, Shaw starts plans to dominate the world through force, money and power. His connections to top officials of corporations and government, acquired via the Club and through his position as CEO of Shaw Industries, make him a powerful enemy. Shaw becomes a major supporter and builder of Sentinels. This activity brings him into frequent contact with the major players of Project: Wideawake, Senator Robert Kelly and Henry Peter Gyrich, to whom he appears to be an anti-mutant bigot.

Meeting the X-Men
Shaw sets his eyes on the X-Men, scheming to capture and study them for use in breeding an army of powerful mutants for the Hellfire Club. He employs the superpowered assassin Warhawk to plant a bug in Cerebro, ensuring the Hellfire Club would be aware of newly manifested mutants at the same moment as the X-Men themselves, as well as giving them access to secret details of their powers and fighting techniques. However, the Club's operatives prove ineffective at defeating the X-Men in the field, and the first two mutants they locate in this manner are lost.

Now aware of the Hellfire Club's existence, the X-Men infiltrate their headquarters, where they are defeated and captured. However, they escape before Shaw can put them to use. Shaw's control of the Hellfire Club grows more tenuous as Pierce proves to be a mutant-hating traitor to the Club and a new recruit to the Inner Circle, Selene, sets her sights on replacing Shaw as the chairman. The Hellfire Club is forced to battle alongside the X-Men against Nimrod, a Sentinel from the future, and though victorious, two key members perish in the fight. After the battle, the Hellfire Club and the X-Men become allies of sorts, with Magneto and Storm filling the position of White King. Arguing that Shaw's support of the Sentinels is endangering the Inner Circle, Magneto, Selene and Emma vote him out of the Club.

Keeping in power
Months later, Shaw was attacked by his son, Shinobi Shaw, who phased his hand into his father's chest to induce a coronary. Shaw was then supposedly blown up in his Swiss Mountain chalet by a bomb set by his son. Shinobi shortly became the new Black King of Hellfire Club; however, Shaw survived, albeit with a scar on his face crossing his left eye, which was removed successfully by Madelyne Pryor (seemingly a sentient psionic construct of X-Man) using her psionic powers during their affair after his reappearance. Shaw became part of a new Inner Circle alongside Selene, Madelyne and Trevor Fitzroy, a descendant of Sebastian himself in an alternate future.

Shaw's first move upon recovery from the bomb was to contact the mutant named Holocaust, who had crossed over from the "Age of Apocalypse" timeline. In exchange for a new armored containment suit, Holocaust agreed to help Shaw capture X-Force, which he did with ease. Shaw then had Tessa telepathically brainwash X-Force to hunt down Cable, but Cable used his own emergent telepathy to break the conditioning and free his team. Shaw's relationship with Holocaust declined soon after.

Shaw's later exploits included vying for control of the Elixir Vitae, thought to be a cure for the Legacy Virus; associations with the British intelligence agency Black Air and an unnamed time-manipulator; and hunting down X-51, the Machine Man. Then, Shaw was apparently ousted from his position as Black King by Selene, who installed the demon Blackheart in his place. This arrangement did not last long, as Selene and Blackheart were defeated and Shaw has since returned to power.

He attempted to use Lady Mastermind to control Tessa (now called "Sage") and Storm's team of X-Men, who were searching for Destiny's prophetic diaries. Then, after Professor X was "outed" as a mutant, Shaw apparently returned to his capitalist roots and converted the NY branch of the Hellfire Club into a strip club, which was in fact a safe haven for mutants regardless of affiliation. Using telepathic strippers, Shaw gleaned secrets from the minds of his patrons, who come in just to have a good decadent time. Thanks to the aid of his employees, Shaw pretended to be a telepath himself.

After a few months, though, Shaw made a play to become the new Lord Imperial of the entire Club worldwide, and invited Sage to help him. Shaw also invited Courtney Ross (who was actually her evil counterpart Sat-Yr-9) and Sunspot to join him as the White Queen and Black King. All three accepted, but Sage effectively betrayed Shaw when she did not warn him that Pierce might try to assassinate him. Shaw met with the X-Men, claiming to be somewhat reformed, just before Pierce's attack. He was then wounded by Pierce, but remained strong enough to literally knock Pierce's head off. However, he was too hurt to maintain his Club position and was replaced by Sunspot, who is now the current Lord Imperial of the Hellfire Club.

Illusion
Later, it seemed he had joined forces with a new Inner Circle which included Cassandra Nova, Negasonic Teenage Warhead, and Emma Frost/Perfection, the latter of whom had since joined the X-Men. As the story arc continued to unfold, the Hellfire Club made their attack as they each targeted an individual member of Cyclops' team of X-Men. Shaw himself defeated Colossus. In the end however, it is revealed that the entire Hellfire Club was not real, and all were mental images created by Emma Frost's mind, which was infected with a special "programming" by Cassandra Nova in an attempt to revive her. The Shaw duplicate vanished after being defeated by Cyclops.

X-Men: Endangered Species
Shaw appears incognito (with an image-inducer) at a funeral for a mutant boy named Landru. When confronted by Professor X, he merely states that he was paying his respects. Xavier overhears his thoughts of a possible coup against Sunspot during the service. When Shaw notices him watching, he quickly creates a Psi-Shield to hide his thoughts.

Mister Sinister and the Cronus Machine
Some time after this Shaw appears at a Hellfire Club dinner hosted by Sunspot and is alerted to a device left to him by his father exploding elsewhere in the compound resulting in the insanity of two club menials and Shaw asking his manservant for a file labelled "Kronos". After being upbraided over the explosion and deaths by da Costa he is ordered to investigate. Shaw however knows the cause. The explosion in the Hellfire Club was caused by the activation of a machine developed beneath the Alamogordo genetics plant in Las Cruces, New Mexico by Mr. Sinister. In the past Sinister had worked here (disguised as a Dr. Milbury) alongside Brian Xavier, Kurt Marko and Irene Adler who had been gathered for him by Jacob Shaw, Sebastian's father, as they all had the X-gene and Sinister predicted their children would be mutants. Sinister then experimented of these children (including Cain Marko, Charles Xavier and Sebastian himself), imprinting himself on their DNA. Sinister's machine, dubbed the Cronus device, was designed to activate soon after his death and would activate these hidden copies until Sinister could be reborn in one of them. Jacob, wanting to protect his son, created the device in the Hellfire Club from Sinister's notes to alert and protect Sebastian from the Cronus device. Shaw travelled to New Mexico to visit another of the children to confirm his theory, running into Xavier and Gambit who were investigating a hit list with the children's names on it. Following them he is present when they are attacked by mercenaries under the employ of Amanda Mueller, a former associate of Sinister's. Xavier is captured and Gambit and Shaw team up to save Xavier. It is revealed that Mueller wants to house the powers (though not the personality) of Sinister herself and so is assassinating the children, having undergone the procedure herself. She shoots Xavier, who is already struggling to stop Sinister from taking over his body, which allows him to take over. Sinister in Xavier's body stops Mueller but is in turn confronted by Shaw and Gambit who destroy the Cronus device while Xavier casts Sinister out of his mind. With the threat gone, Shaw leaves.

Original Sin
Later, Shaw joins forces with Claudine Renko, a.k.a. Miss Sinister, a female clone of Mister Sinister. Together they manipulate Wolverine into defeating the new members of the Inner Circle, try to take control of Logan's son, Daken, and set up a trap against Xavier. Shaw also attempts to kill Xavier but is stopped by Daken. Shaw is eventually confronted by Wolverine and begins to fight. Shaw's powers initially protect him from being injured by Wolverine's adamantium claws, allowing him to fare extremely well. The ending of the fight takes place off panel and Wolverine appears with his body and claws soaked with blood, which he soon confirms belongs to Shaw.

Dark Reign
During her early days as the White Queen, Sebastian Shaw sends Emma to convince Namor to join the Hellfire Club. Instead, Namor takes her to his kingdom and they begin a relationship. Believing Emma to have betrayed him for Namor, Shaw sends a reprogrammed Sentinel to Atlantis, attacking the two and destroying the kingdom. As Namor confronts Shaw for his treachery, Selene takes telepathic hold of Emma, erasing her memories of Namor, who vows revenge on Shaw. In the present, Emma reveals that her initial battle with Phoenix unlocked her memories of Namor. She makes a pact with him, seducing Shaw and using her telepathy to make Namor believe she has executed him, while secretly telepathically incapacitating Shaw. Per their deal, Namor vows to protect mutant-kind as his own people, while Emma, more determined to fill her role as a leader of mutant-kind, contacts Cyclops to have Shaw captured by the X-Men for "crimes against mutant-kind." Approaching him later in his cell, Emma reveals that she has captured Shaw for Namor and on the basis that the Sentinels he commissioned were ones later used by Cassandra Nova to destroy Genosha. She sentences him to remember nothing but the faces of the Genoshan victims using her telepathy.

Necrosha
Shaw is targeted by Selene along with all those who failed her in her attempt to ascend to godhood. It is revealed that sometime after M-Day he had his son, Shinobi Shaw killed. Selene sends Shinobi and Harry Leland after Shaw and Donald Pierce.

Utopia
Due to Namor's presence on Utopia, Emma realizes that Shaw's continued existence poses a threat to the agreement she had made with Namor earlier. She decides to finally kill him, but her plans are exposed when Shadowcat accidentally picks up her thoughts during a psi-conversation between her and Colossus. While disgusted at Frost's intended actions, Shadowcat offers her a compromise. As she currently exists as a ghost, she is the perfect tool for making Shaw disappear.

Fantomex, Shadowcat and Emma then take him aboard E.V.A., whilst they work out how to dispose of him. Emma wakes Shaw up and asks him to recount the early days of the Hellfire Club. Emma and two other dancers were the closest of friends, when one night, Emma was offered, by Shaw, the position of Queen. The only stipulation was that one of the two girls had to die. She stated she did not care which one was killed and watched as Shaw proceeded to kill both. Present day, Emma starts to question Shaw further when Fantomex, bored with Emma's "woe is me" recounts of her history, drops the floor from under Shaw. Emma goes into a rage at Fantomex, as Fantomex was unaware that Shaw could absorb energy, such as that from hitting the ground from such heights.

Shaw proceeds to engage Frost's group, stating that he would rather die than see Emma go on breathing a moment longer. Helped by a maimed Fantomex, the former White Queen tricks Shaw into allowing her into his mind, and (with a little encouragement from Shadowcat), as opposed to killing him, finds the most landlocked place in his mind, the point safest from Namor's rage, and wipes his memory. Shaw's attitude immediately changes, and he seems to have no recollection of who he is, where he is, or the identities of anyone around him. In response to his asking who she is, Emma Frost simply rebuffs him, and asks him who "he" is, coldly telling him that he always said he was a "self-made man" and now is his chance to prove it. She then leaves with the rest of her expedition, leaving a pondering Shaw kneeling in the mud.

Schism/Regenesis
Hope Summers and the Lights find Shaw, assuming him to be a new mutant. When they extract him and bring him back to Utopia, Cyclops is not exactly happy to see him.

Avengers vs. X-Men
After the Avengers invaded Utopia as part of the Avengers vs. X-Men storyline, Shaw along with the kids in Utopia were taken to the Avengers Academy. It is revealed that Shaw read the file on him and now knows everything about his past although he claims not to remember it. Wolverine distrusts Shaw and insists that he should be imprisoned. Shaw relents and is imprisoned in a cell that absorbs kinetic energy, meaning that Shaw would be unable to break it by building up his own kinetic energy by punching it. Shaw however, asks for books to keep him occupied and uses a book to hit himself for 8 hours straight, allowing him to build up enough energy to break out of the cell and into the storm drain. Hercules, Tigra and Madison Jeffries try to stop him, but are quickly defeated. Elsewhere, the young mutants from Utopia, now joined by Ricochet, Wiz Kid and Hollow, confront the Academy students. Shortly after this, Shaw appears to the teenagers. Before a battle between both parties can become serious, X-23 and Finesse warn their friends that Shaw's body language indicates that he doesn't mean to hurt anyone, but to help the mutant children to escape. After both sides agree that the mutant children shouldn't be confined against their will, they fake a battle in order to justify their escape in front of the cameras at the Academy.

All-New, All-Different Marvel
As part of the All-New, All-Different Marvel, Sebastian Shaw represented Shaw Industries when he attended a meeting at the Universal Bank with Tiberius Stone of Alchemax, Wilson Fisk of Fisk Industries, Darren Cross of Cross Technological Enterprises, Zeke Stane of Stane International, Shingen Harada of the Yashida Corporation, Frr'dox of Shi'ar Solutions Consolidated, and Wilhelmina Kensington of Kilgore Arms where they discussed with Dario Agger about his and Roxxon Energy Corporation's plans to exploit the Ten Realms of Asgard. Sebastian Shaw also saw the arrival of Exterminatrix of the Midas Foundation who knocked out Dario and declared herself a new member of their assembly.

Krakoa
In the new phase of the X-Men, beginning with the dual miniseries House of X and Powers of X, Shaw becomes part of the Quiet Council of Krakoa, a ruling body of 14 mutants who oversee the recent mutant nation of Krakoa. He is also part of the Hellfire Trading Company, responsible for smuggling Krakoa's new remedies through the black market.

During this new phase, he is part of the cast of the Marauders.

Powers and abilities
Shaw is a mutant with the unique ability to absorb all kinetic and thermal energy directed at him and use it to augment his strength, speed, stamina and recuperation capabilities to superhuman levels. He absorbs the energy of any impact he is struck by, including not only direct physical blows, but also the impact of bullets and throwing weapons, and less successfully, concussive energy beams; notably Cyclops' optic blasts. By absorbing successive blows from an opponent, Shaw can surpass the physical abilities of said opponent and then overpower them. His speed is the attribute most dramatically increased by his power; after absorbing enough energy he can attack more quickly than opponents can react. He is sometimes shown to be capable of absorbing the cutting, piercing and thrusting energy from a blade. His powers can enable his body to withstand cutting from adamantium, but only for a short time.

In the past, Shaw has been limited to a certain amount of energy and would lose consciousness when he surpassed his capabilities. Subsequently, however, Shaw has been shown to now be able to take in an indefinite amount of energy without any ill effects. The power he absorbs dissipates over time, and exposure to the elements causes it to drain rapidly. Without any absorbed energy, Shaw is merely a strong ordinary human in excellent physical condition, but regularly works to keep his strength at a superhuman level. In one instance, he was shown to spend time hitting a wall after waking in order to build up his power reserves before starting the day. Shaw also can forgo sleep if he receives enough energy. Often he will have his mercenaries pummel him so that he would not need to sleep for some time.

Shaw also has a successful business acumen and access to sophisticated weaponry. He not only prides himself on his power and the connections it allows him, but on knowing his opponents and how best to defeat them, whether in battle or in business. He also possesses technology that can block telepathic intrusions by Professor X.

Relatives

 Reverend Hiram Shaw: Sorcerer Supreme and an ambitious Puritan Reverend during the Salem Witch Trials, 1692.
 Sarah Shaw: Hiram's wife. Killed by Dormammu when Hiram refuses to submit to him.
 Obadiah Shaw: Son of Hiram and Sarah. He fell in love with Abigail Harkness, much to the disapproval of his father, who suspected her to be a witch.
 Abigail Harkness: Obadiah's girlfriend. She is arrested for witchcraft after Sarah's death, though Obadiah escapes and runs away with her. When the two are chased by Hiram, she reveals that she is a true witch. She is presumably related to Agatha Harkness.
 Elizabeth Shaw-Worthington: A teenager who fled from England when she was 13 years old. In 1780, she was taken by Lady Grey of the Hellfire Club as her protégé, who wanted to use her to seduce General Wallace Worthington and extract military secrets in order to defeat George Washington. Elizabeth fell in love with Worthington and married him, neglecting her duties to Lady Grey. Worthington is killed by the Hellfire Club, though it is hinted that Elizabeth was already pregnant, making her an ancestor of Warren Worthington III.
 Brigadier-General Cornelius Shaw: A member of the Inner Circle of London's Hellfire Club and Sebastian's grandfather. Presumably a King in the London Branch Inner Circle.
 Esau Shaw: Cornelius Shaw's son, who was invited to take his father's place in the Hellfire Club. Killed by brother Jacob.
 Jacob Shaw: Cornelius Shaw's second son and Sebastian's father, who desired the place offered to Esau in the Hellfire Club. He was mutated by Mister Sinister and given limited shapeshifting powers. He kills his brother Esau after assuming the form of Waltham Pierce. After he fell sick, doctors failed to cure him due to his altered genes.
 Shinobi Shaw: Sebastian's son with an unknown woman.
 Anthony Shaw: Black King of the Hellfire Club in Bishop's future timeline, seemingly Shinobi's son.
 William Shaw: Anthony Shaw's son.
 Trevor Fitzroy: Anthony Shaw's illegitimate son, Shinobi's grandson.
 Samarra Shaw: Leader of Clan Hellfire in the Chronomancer alternate future, perhaps Anthony's sister or daughter.

Reception
 In 2019, CBR.com ranked Sebastian Shaw 5th in their "X-Men: The 5 Deadliest Members Of The Hellfire Club (& The 5 Weakest)" list.

Other versions

Age of Apocalypse
In the Age of Apocalypse, Sebastian Shaw is one of the many mutant aristocrats and a prized servant of Apocalypse. He reveals Angel's connections with the X-Men and other rebels to his master, having seen Angel talking to the former X-Man Gambit.
After the death of Apocalypse and the rise of his successor Weapon Omega, Shaw managed to acquire Warren Worthington III's nightclub "Haven" and remade it into his image and renamed it as Hellfire Club. The nightclub eventually became an international social club for wealthy elites, all the while trying to influence world events, in accordance with their own agenda. When Weapon Omega started resurrecting the formerly deceased Alphas, Shaw and the Hellfire Club's position was once again threatened. Shaw was later sent to prison and is killed by Donald Pierce, who slipped poison into Shaw’s drink.

Captain Britain
In Alan Moore's Captain Britain – Waiting for the End of the World, Sebastian Shaw makes contributions to help Sir James Jaspers in his cause against the superhumans of Britain. He is a pawn in a game of chess played between Merlin and his daughter.

Forever Yesterday
In the alternate universe created by the Sphinx, Shaw fights against tyranny alongside such heroes as Cannonball, Juggernaut and Beast.

House of M
In the House of M, Sebastian Shaw was granted the position of S.H.I.E.L.D. Director after he aligned himself with Magneto and helped him transform Sentinels into mutant-protecting robots using his company's money.

Mutant X
In the Mutant X universe, Shaw is still the Black King of the Hellfire Club, but is enclosed in a protective shell for reasons unknown.

Ultimate Marvel
The Ultimate version of Sebastian Shaw is also the leader of the Hellfire Club, a secret society that worships the Phoenix God. Ultimate Shaw, unlike his mainstream counterpart, never demonstrated any signs of mutant powers. He was killed by the Phoenix.

X-Men Noir
In the Marvel Noir series X-Men Noir, Shaw is a powerful politician who commands the Brotherhood to do his bidding.

In other media

Television
 Sebastian Shaw appears in the X-Men: The Animated Series four-part episode "The Dark Phoenix". This version is a member of the Inner Circle Club.
 Shaw will return in X-Men '97.
 Sebastian Shaw appears in Wolverine and the X-Men, voiced by Graham McTavish. This version is a member of the Hellfire Club.

Film

Sebastian Shaw appears in X-Men: First Class, portrayed by Kevin Bacon. This version possesses the additional ability to utilize kinetic energy as sustenance, maintain his youth and life, and fire energy blasts. Additionally, he is fluent in English, German, French, and Russian and previously operated as Nazi scientist Dr. Klaus Schmidt during World War II, during which he attempted to experiment on a young Erik Lehnsherr to tease out his mutant abilities. Sometime after the war, Shaw went on to acquire a helmet from the Soviet Union capable of blocking telepaths' powers and became the leader of the Hellfire Club in the hopes of exploiting the Cuban Missile Crisis to incite World War III in a Darwinian plot to accelerate the emergence of mutants. Ultimately, he is foiled by Moira MacTaggert's Division X and killed by Lehnsherr, who takes the helmet for himself and unites the Hellfire Club's remnants under his leadership.

Video games
 Sebastian Shaw appears as the final boss of X-Men.
 Sebastian Shaw appears in X-Men Legends II: Rise of Apocalypse, voiced by Alan Shearman.
 Sebastian Shaw's company Systemized Cybernetics Lab appears in X-Men Origins: Wolverine.
 Sebastian Shaw appears as a boss in Marvel: Avengers Alliance.

Miscellaneous
 Sebastian Shaw appears in "The Legacy Quest" novel trilogy, written by Steve Lyons. He forms a reluctant alliance with the X-Men to face various menaces while waiting for an opportunity to seize control of a possible cure for the Legacy Virus.
 Hiram Shaw appears in the Marvel's Midnight Suns prequel short "Salem Sisters" as a sorcerer who tried to harness the Darkholds power to conquer the world. Lilith and the Caretaker fought him for years until the latter sealed him within a church while the former took the Darkhold for herself.

References

External links
 Sebastian Shaw at Marvel.com
 Sebastian Shaw: The Virtue of Selfishness at UncannyXmen.net

20th-century translators
Characters created by Chris Claremont
Characters created by John Byrne (comics)
Comics characters introduced in 1980
Fictional businesspeople
Fictional characters from Pittsburgh
Fictional characters with absorption or parasitic abilities
Fictional characters with energy-manipulation abilities
Marvel Comics Nazis
Marvel Comics scientists
Fictional linguists
Fictional physicists
Marvel Comics characters with superhuman strength
Marvel Comics characters who can move at superhuman speeds
Marvel Comics male supervillains
Marvel Comics mutants
X-Men supporting characters